Master Key is a South Korean variety show that aired on SBS every Saturday at 6:10 p.m. (KST) from October 14, 2017 to January 6, 2018.

Format

Episodes 1–3
The game starts with 12 contestants trying to find 12 keys scattered around Master Village, one for each player, before proceeding to the Room of Fate and check if their respective key is one of the two Master Keys or not. Contestants will then be divided into two teams of six and compete in various Investigation mission games in order to obtain clues about the Master Key owners. The audience also acts as Watchers and can vote for one of the players before each episode to allow the player to win a special benefit of obtaining additional clues about the Ms. At the end of the episode, the contestants have to vote for two opponents that they believe are the Master Key owners. Those who correctly vote for both Master Key owners will win the prize of 12 gold keys. The two Master Key Owners will have to avoid getting voted the most and must find each other in order to win the top prize. If neither criterion occurs, no winners are declared.

Episodes 4–9
The contestants proceed directly to the Room of Fate, where each of them picks one among the 12 keys placed inside the room. Among the keys, one of them is the Angel Master Key and another one is the Devil Master Key, the rest being the regular keys. Contestants, as stated above, will then be divided into two teams of six and compete in various investigation mission games in order to obtain clues about the Master Key owners, while each trying to individually win the votes from other players by claiming himself/herself as the Angel Master Key owner. The audience also acts as Watchers and can vote for one of the players before each episode to allow the player to win a special benefit of being able to cast two votes instead of only one vote for the final voting. At the end of the episode, the contestants must vote for one name that they believe is the Angel Master Key owner. The prize is distributed according to one of the three possible results below:
If the Angel Master Key owner is the most voted contestant, the prize is won by the owner of the Angel Master Key and all contestants who voted for him/her. The amount of gold keys won by each of them is the base prize number of gold keys multiplied by the number of votes received by the Angel Master Key, then are equally distributed among all winners.
If the Devil Master Key owner is the most voted contestant, the prize is won by the owner of the Devil Master Key. The amount of the gold keys won is the base prize number of gold keys multiplied by the number of votes received by him/her.
If one of the regular key owner is the most voted contestant, the prize is won by him/herself. The amount of the gold keys won is the base prize number of gold keys added by the number of votes received by him/her.

The format is slightly changed on episode 8. Out of the 12 players, two contestants will be randomly assigned with the ability to cast extra votes at the final voting, one being able to cast two votes and another being able to cast three votes. The Devil Master Key owner will also gain an additional vote each time his/her team win an Investigation Mission game. The benefit for the Watchers' voting winner has also changed to a phone call with the Key Man, where the benefit winner can ask two questions and the Key Man will only answer yes or no.

A further change is implemented on episode 9 of which the number of Devil Master Key owners is increased to two and there is only a player randomly assigned with the ability to cast 3 votes. The benefit for the Watchers' voting winner changes to selecting a player and confirm whether that player is a Master Key owner or not, and is only known to the voting winner. At the end of the final voting, if one of the two Devil Master Key owners is the most voted player, the prize will be won by both Devil Master Key owners. The amount of the gold keys won is the base prize number of gold keys multiplied by the number of votes received by him/her, then is divided equally among both Devil Master Key owners.

Episode 10 
The format underwent a major change. There are only 7 contestants and one Master Key. In the beginning, the contestants have to work together as a team to find Master Cars. Each Master Car has one mission and if the contestants manage to complete it, they'll get a key and check whether it can open the box or not. If they find both keys to open the box, they get 6 keys and only one of them is the Master Key and one player doesn't get a key. The players have to find boxes and try to open them with their own key and if they can open 2 or more boxes then their key is the Master Key and they can open the Master Box which has one golden key as a prize. The winner can be the owner of the Master Key or another player who steals the key.

Episode 11 
At the beginning of the episode and after one mission, the 7 contestants have to choose one of the two choices, which are different. If they win the mission they get either one or two keys. If every contestant has one key, everyone has to open a box and choose between the two choices individually. If all members choose '7' everyone gets a golden key but if they choose '1' only one of them can win and the Master Key belongs to the players that chose '7'.

Episode 12 
Lee Soo-geun served as the host, while others formed three teams: Jun Hyun-moo and Mingyu were part of the white team, Kim Dong-jun and Ko Sung-hee of the yellow team, and Kim Jong-min and Jeong Se-woon of the green team. They played Olympic games and the team with the most points won.

Episode 13 
The members have to escape by completing the missions and gaining the keys to open the box with the tickets for the bus to Seoul and they only have limited time. On the way to Seoul, they have to complete missions at rest stations to get hints about the location of the Master Box.

Cast
The original fixed members of the show are Lee Soo-geun and Jun Hyun-moo. Kang Daniel and Ong Seong-wu were initially guests for episode 1, but later officially joined the program, starting from episode 4 to episode 10.

List of Episodes

List of Recurring cast 
The following is a compilation of Recurring cast and the number of times they have appeared on Master Key.

Ratings 
 In the ratings below, the highest rating for the show will be in red, and the lowest rating for the show will be in blue each year.

Awards and nominations

Notes

References

External links 
  

2017 South Korean television series debuts
Korean-language television shows
Seoul Broadcasting System original programming
South Korean variety television shows
2018 South Korean television series endings